The 2005 China Masters was a badminton tournament which took place at the University Students' Gymnasium in Beijing, China, on 29 August–4 September 2005 and had a total purse of $250,000. This is the inaugural edition of the tournament, and rated as 6–star IBF World Grand Prix event.

Men's singles

Finals

Top half

Section 1

Section 2

Bottom half

Section 3

Section 4

Women's singles

Finals

Top half

Section 1

Section 2

Bottom half

Section 3

Section 4

Men's doubles

Finals

Top half

Section 1

Section 2

Bottom half

Section 3

Section 4

Women's doubles

Finals

Top half

Bottom half

Mixed doubles

Finals

Top half

Bottom half

References

External links 
 Tournament Link

China Masters
China Masters
China Masters
Sports competitions in Beijing